is a Sapporo Municipal Subway station in Nishi-ku, Sapporo, Hokkaido, Japan. It is numbered T03.

Station layout
The station consists of an underground island platform serving two tracks.

Platforms

Surrounding area
 Kotoni Station (JR Hokkaido)
 Japan National Route 5 (to Hakodate)
 Kotoni city bus Terminal
 Sapporo Nishi Ward Office
 Kotoni Shrine
 Hondori Kotoni Police station
 Kotoni Post Office
 Sapporo Yamanote Library
 Maxvalu supermarket, Kotoni store
 ÆON Sapporo Kotoni store
 Sapporo Shinkin Bank, Kotoni branch
 Asahikawa Shinkin Bank, Kotoni branch
 North Pacific Bank, Kotoni branch
 Hokkaido Bank, Kotoni branch
 Hokuriku Bank, Kotoni branch

Gallery

External links

 Sapporo Subway Stations

Railway stations in Japan opened in 1976
Railway stations in Sapporo
Sapporo Municipal Subway